The Alan T. Waterman Award, named after Alan Tower Waterman, is the United States's highest honorary award for scientists no older than 40, or no more than 10 years past receipt of their Ph.D. It is awarded on a yearly basis by the National Science Foundation.  In addition to the medal, the awardee receives a grant of $1,000,000 to be used at the institution of their choice over a period of five years for advanced scientific research.

History of the Award

Congress established the annual award in August 1975 to mark the 25th Anniversary of the National Science Foundation and to honor its first Director, Alan T. Waterman.  The annual award recognizes an outstanding young researcher in any field of science or engineering supported by the National Science Foundation.

Eligibility and nomination process

Candidates must be U.S. citizens or permanent residents. Prior to the 2018 competition, candidates must have been 35 years of age or younger or not more than 7 years beyond receipt of the Ph.D. degree by December 31 of the year in which they are nominated. As of the 2018 competition, these requirements were changed to 40 years of age or 10 years post-PhD. Candidates should have demonstrated exceptional individual achievements in scientific or engineering research of sufficient quality to place them at the forefront of their peers. Criteria include originality, innovation, and significant impact on the field.  Potential candidates must be nominated and require four letters of reference, but none can be submitted from the nominee’s home institution.  Solicitation announcements are sent to universities and colleges, scientific, engineering and other professional societies and organizations, and members of the National Academy of Sciences and the National Academy of Engineering.

Award process and committee composition

Candidates are reviewed by the Alan T. Waterman Award committee, which is made up of 12 members, 8 rotators and 4 members ex officio.  The current ex officio members are Ralph Cicerone, President of the National Academy of Sciences, Subra Suresh, Director of the National Science Foundation, Steven C. Beering, Chairman of the National Science Board, and Charles M. Vest, President of the National Academy of Engineering.  After review of the nominees, the Committee recommends the most outstanding candidate(s) to the Director of the National Science Foundation and the National Science Board, which then makes the final determination.

List of recipients 
2022
Jessica Tierney

Daniel B. Larremore

Lara Thompson

 2021  Nicholas Carnes

 2021  Melanie Wood

 2020  Emily Balskus 

 2020  John Dabiri

 2019  Jennifer Dionne

 2019 Mark Braverman

 2018  Kristina Olson

 2017  Baratunde A. Cola

 2017  John V. Pardon

 2016  Mircea Dincă

 2015  Andrea Alù

 2014  Feng Zhang

 2013  Mung Chiang 

 2012  Scott Aaronson

 2012  Robert Wood

 2011  

2010 Subhash Khot

2009 David Charbonneau

2008 Terence Tao

2007 Peidong Yang

2006 Emmanuel Candes

2005 Dalton Conley

2004 Kristi Anseth

2003 Angelika Amon

2002 Erich Jarvis

2001 Vahid Tarokh

2000 Jennifer A. Doudna

1999 Chaitan Khosla

1998 Christopher C. Cummins

1997 Eric Allin Cornell

1996 Robert M. Waymouth

1995 Matthew P.A. Fisher

1994 Gang Tian

1993 

1992 Shrinivas R. Kulkarni

1991 Herbert Edelsbrunner

1990 Mark E. Davis

1989 Richard H. Scheller

1988 Peter Schultz

1987 Lawrence H. Summers

1986 Edward Witten

1985 Jacqueline Barton

1984 Harvey Friedman

1983 Corey S. Goodman (de)

1982 Richard Axel

1981 W. Clark Still

1980 Roy Schwitters

1979 William Thurston

1978 Richard A. Muller

1977 J. William Schopf

1976 Charles Fefferman

References

External links 
 Waterman recipients
 Alan T. Waterman Award NSF Page
 Alan T. Waterman Award 2015
 Alan T. Waterman Award 2017
 Alan T. Waterman Award 2019
 Alan T. Waterman Award 2020
 Alan T. Waterman Award 2021
 Change of Eligibility Criteria

Science and technology awards
American awards
Awards established in 1975